One Broadway or 1 Broadway may refer to the following:
 One Broadway (Miami)
 1 Broadway, New York City